Ruth Hill may refer to:
 Ruth Edmonds Hill, American scholar and oral historian
 Ruth W. Hill, American numismatist